Katrien Vermeire (born Ostend, 1979) is a Belgian artist.

Career
Katrien Vermeire studied photography at the Royal Academy of Fine Arts in Ghent and art history at Ghent University. She won the quadrennial Fine Arts Award of the Province of West Flanders in 2002. Her work has been exhibited in numerous galleries both in Belgium and abroad, including the FOAM photography museum in Amsterdam and the new Museum M in Leuven.

In 2011, Vermeire's photo series Godspeed,  in which she followed swarms of fireflies in the Great Smoky Mountains photographing male fireflies flashing in large groups at night as a mating ritual, was selected for Foam Magazine's No. 28 Talent. The Wave, a photo and film project co-directed with Sarah Vanagt, premiered at the 18th Biennale of Sydney 2012 and was selected for international festivals including Locarno, IDFA Amsterdam and IFFR Rotterdam. Her first documentary short film Der Kreislauf (A Handful) won the Kidseye Grand Prize at the 2014 Rhode Island International Film Festival.

References

External links
www.katrienvermeire.com – The official website of Katrien Vermeire.

Katrien Vermeire: Flanders Arts Institute

1979 births
Living people
21st-century Belgian artists
21st-century Belgian women artists
21st-century women photographers
Belgian women film directors
Belgian photographers
Belgian women photographers
Ghent University alumni
Royal Academy of Fine Arts (Ghent) alumni
Artists from Ostend